General William Washington Gordon II (1834–1912) was a Confederate captain in the American Civil War, later serving as a brigadier general in the United States Army during the Spanish–American War.

Life
William Washington Gordon II was born in Savannah, Georgia on October 14, 1834, the eldest son of Senator William Washington Gordon of Georgia. He graduated B.A. from Yale University in 1854, before returning to Savannah to become a cotton and rice broker, forming the firm of Tison & Gordon in 1856.

Commissioned into the Georgia Hussars as a lieutenant at the outset of the American Civil War in 1861, Gordon fought with distinction being promoted captain and then adjutant, receiving his only wound at Lovejoy's Station after the Battle of Jonesboro (1864).

Gordon then returned to his family's cotton plantation, becoming chairman of the Savannah Cotton Exchange and vice-president of the Merchants' National Bank, as well as a founding director of the Georgia Railroad and Banking Company. He was elected to the Georgia Assembly 1884–89 and served as commanding officer of the State Militia, being appointed in 1891 a brigadier general of the US Army.

He died in White Sulphur Springs, West Virginia on September 11, 1912, and was buried at Laurel Grove Cemetery in Savannah.

Family
Gordon married Eleanor Lytle Kinzie, younger daughter of Colonel John Harris Kinzie, on December 21, 1857. They had six children:

Major William Washington Gordon III (1866–1932);
Colonel George Arthur Gordon (1872–1947);
Eleanor Kinzie Gordon (1858–1933), married Congressman Richard Wayne Parker;
Juliette Magill Kinzie Gordon (1860–1927), founder of the Girl Scouts of the USA;
Sarah Alice Gordon (1863–1880);
Mabel McLane Gordon (1870–1951), married Hon Rowland Leigh (1859–1943), having two children: author Jane Gordon and screenwriter Rowland Leigh.

References

External links
 Yale's Confederates: A Biographical Dictionary (2008)
 Burke's Peerage & Baronetage

1834 births
1912 deaths
19th-century American people
Confederate States Army officers
People of Georgia (U.S. state) in the American Civil War
People from Savannah, Georgia
Yale University alumni
United States Army generals
American people of Scottish descent
Members of the Georgia House of Representatives